James "J.J." Johnson (born February 25, 1943) is an American politician. He was a Democratic member of the Delaware House of Representatives from 2005 to 2019.

Prior to running for office, Johnson was a union worker at the former Chrysler plant in Newark, Delaware. He also served as president of the United Auto Workers and a member of the Coalition of Black Trade Unionists. During his time in office, he was a "leader in criminal justice reform" and a champion of workers' rights, racial equality, and economic justice.

Electoral history
In 2004, Johnson ran for the District 16 seat left open by retiring Democrat William I. Houghton. He won the Democratic primary and went on to win the general election with 5,823 votes (81.5%) against Republican nominee James Stockwell.
In 2006, Johnson was unopposed for the general election, winning 4,221 votes.
In 2008, Johnson was unopposed for the general election, winning 7,078 votes.
In 2010, Johnson was unopposed for the general election, winning 5,328 votes.
In 2012, Johnson won the general election with 7,613 votes (96.5%) against Libertarian candidate John Machurek.
In 2014, Johnson won the general election with 3,802 votes (82.5%) against Republican nominee Gregory Coverdale.
In 2016, Johnson was unopposed for the general election, winning 7,536 votes.

References

External links
Official page at the Delaware General Assembly
 

Place of birth missing (living people)
1943 births
Living people
African-American state legislators in Delaware
Democratic Party members of the Delaware House of Representatives
21st-century American politicians
Goldey–Beacom College alumni
People from New Castle County, Delaware
21st-century African-American politicians
20th-century African-American people